"Surrender Dorothy" is a famous special effect used in the 1939 film The Wizard of Oz, where the Wicked Witch of the West flies on her broomstick to write the two-word phrase across the sky. The phrase later attained local fame as a graffito in the Washington, DC, metropolitan area.

Appearance in the movie

The first appearance of the phrase is in the 1939 version of The Wizard of Oz (it is not in the novel or any previous adaptations). In the scene, Dorothy Gale (Judy Garland) has reached the Emerald City with her companions The Scarecrow (Ray Bolger), Tin Woodman (Jack Haley) and Cowardly Lion (Bert Lahr), whereupon they are treated to the hospitality and technological comforts of the fantastic city. As they leave the "Wash & Brush Up Co.", the Wicked Witch of the West (Margaret Hamilton) appears in the sky riding her broomstick, skywriting the words "SURRENDER DOROTHY". The terrified townspeople of the Emerald City – and the four intrepid adventurers – respond by rushing to the chamber where the Wizard of Oz himself (Frank Morgan) resides, only to be turned away by a Majordomo (also played by Frank Morgan) based loosely on the Soldier with the Green Whiskers.

The special effect was achieved by using a hypodermic needle, spreading black ink across the bottom of a glass tank filled with tinted water.

Originally, there was a full message written out by the Witch, seen only in the first 120-minute test screening. The full message read "SURRENDER DOROTHY OR DIE --W W W".

Washington area graffiti

The famous graffiti reading "Surrender Dorothy" in the D.C. metropolitan area first appeared on the outer loop of I-495, the "Capital Beltway", on a railroad bridge near the Washington D.C. Temple of the Church of Jesus Christ of Latter-day Saints in Kensington, Maryland. The building is illuminated at night and the graffito first appeared in late 1973. It was removed by the Maryland State Police; however, it has been periodically repainted in various forms by equally unknown persons since the initial police removal.

The rail line which contains the bridge is the old B&O Metropolitan Branch, now owned by CSX Transportation, which operates the MARC Brunswick Line and various freight trains on that branch. The location of the phrase is visible on approach driving on I-495 from the east, but only after one passes under the first of three bridges. It is the second of three bridges over the Beltway approaching from the east, with Seminary Road before it, and Linden Lane after it. As one approaches the bridges, first only the temple is visible in the distance, then as one passes under the first bridge, the temple comes back into view just as the words "Surrender Dorothy" appear.

In summer 2007, a new piece of graffiti appeared on the rail bridge. The word "SURRENDER" was reduced in size to fit into a single section of the rail bridge, and the word "DOROTHY" was omitted from the graffiti. The previous message is no longer visible, but may still be detected at the top of the bridge, as the paint used to cover it does not exactly match the original paint on the bridge. The smaller "SURRENDER" graphic is located near the bottom of the bridge, over the far-left lane of traffic on the Outer Loop. On August 24, 2018, "SURRENDER DONALD" lettering (referring to US president Donald Trump) was spotted on the same bridge over the Washington Beltway. Evidently, the sign was made of easily removable letters that minimize property damage and was installed between 4 and 5 AM. Reportedly, Claude Taylor and his MadDog PAC claimed responsibility. On November 5, during the 2020 United States presidential election, "SURRENDER DONALD" appeared again – this time in paint.

Other cultural references
The phrase was also later featured in Martin Scorsese's 1985 film After Hours. In the film, Marcy (Rosanna Arquette) relates that her former husband would scream the phrase during sex.

References

External links
 

Special effects
Culture of Washington, D.C.
American graffiti artists
The Wizard of Oz (1939 film)
Graffiti and unauthorised signage